In radio systems, many different antenna types are used whose properties are especially crafted for particular applications. Antennas can be classified in various ways. The list below groups together antennas under common operating principles, following the way antennas are classified in many engineering textbooks.

 The dipole, monopole, array, and large loop antenna types discussed below typically function as resonant antennas; in resonant antennas, waves of current and voltage bounce back and forth between the ends, or circulate around a closed loop, and their overlapping sections add and subtract to form standing waves along the elements.
 Traveling wave antennas are not resonant: Their current and voltage waves travel in one direction along the antenna elements and then are absorbed by a resistor.
 Aperture antennas are made of an outer, surrounding reflective surface whose shape concentrates waves striking it onto a small inner antenna; the inner antenna can be either resonant or non-resonant.

Dipole

The dipole consists of two conductors, usually metal rods or wires, usually arranged symmetrically, end-to-end, with one side of the balanced feedline from the transmitter or receiver attached to each. The most common type, the half-wave dipole, consists of two resonant elements just under a quarter wavelength long. This antenna radiates maximally in directions perpendicular to the antenna's axis, giving it a small directive gain of 2.15 dBi. Although half-wave dipoles are used alone as omnidirectional antennas, they are also a building block of many other more complicated directional antennas.

 Turnstile – Two dipole antennas mounted at right angles, fed with a phase difference of 90°. This antenna is unusual in that it radiates in all directions (no nulls in the radiation pattern), with horizontal polarization in directions coplanar with the elements, circular polarization normal to that plane, and elliptical polarization in other directions. Used for receiving signals from satellites, as circular polarization is transmitted by many satellites.

 Corner reflector – A directive antenna with moderate gain of about 8 dBi often used at UHF frequencies. Consists of a dipole mounted in front of two reflective metal screens joined at an angle, usually 90°. Used as a rooftop UHF television antenna and for point-to-point data links.

 Patch (microstrip) – A type of antenna with elements consisting of metal sheets mounted over a ground plane.  Similar to dipole with gain of 6–9 dBi. Integrated into surfaces such as aircraft bodies. Their easy fabrication using PCB techniques have made them popular in modern wireless devices. Often combined into arrays.

 Biconical antenna – a dipole with cone-shaped arms, with the feedpoint where their tips meet. They show broader bandwidth than ordinary dipoles, up to three octaves above their base frequency.

 Bow-tie antenna or butterfly antenna – a dipole whose arms are triangular or arrow-shaped with the feedpoint where the tips of the triangles meet. It is a flattened version of a biconical antenna. The triangles can either be cut from sheet metal with solid metal centers, or two wires with their far ends connected outlining the shape of a bow-tie, or with unconnected ends in an "X" shape.
 Fan dipole or mulit-dipole – a common broadband and / or wideband dipole variant similar to the bow-tie antenna, with several dipole arms of different lengths radiating from the combined antenna's central connection point.

Monopole

A monopole antenna is a half-dipole (see above); it consists of a single conductor such as a metal rod, usually mounted over the ground or an artificial conducting surface (a so-called ground plane). One side of the feedline from the receiver or transmitter is connected to the conductor, and the other side to ground or the artificial ground plane. The radio waves reflected from the ground plane appear as if they came from a fictitious image antenna seemingly below the ground plane, with the monopole and its phantom image effectively forming a dipole. Hence, the monopole antenna has a radiation pattern identical to the top half of the pattern of a similar dipole antenna, and a radiation efficiency a bit less than half of the dipole. Since all of the equivalent dipole's radiation is concentrated in a half-space, the antenna has twice (3 dB increase of) the gain of a similar dipole, neglecting power lost in the ground plane.

The most common form is the quarter-wave monopole which is one-quarter of a wavelength long and has a gain of 5.12 dBi when mounted over a ground plane. Monopoles have an omnidirectional radiation pattern, so they are used for broad coverage of an area, and have vertical polarization. To reduce signal absorption by the Earth, ground waves used for broadcasting at low frequencies must be vertically polarized, so large vertical monopole antennas are used for broadcasting in the MF, LF, and VLF bands. Small monopoles ("whips") are used as nondirectional antennas on portable radios in the HF, VHF, and UHF bands. 

 Whip – Type of antenna used on mobile and portable radios in the VHF and UHF bands such as “boom boxes”, consists of a flexible rod, often made of telescoping segments. 

 Rubber ducky or normal-mode helix – Most common antenna used on portable two-way radios and cordless phones due to its compactness. Consists of an electrically short wire helix. The helical shape adds inductance to cancel the capacitive reactance of the short radiator, making it resonant. Like all electrically short antennas it is nearly isotropic – has very low gain.

 Ground plane antenna – a whip antenna with several rods extending horizontally from base of whip attached to the ground side of the feedline. Since the whip is mounted above ground, the horizontal rods form an artificial ground plane under the antenna to increase its gain. Used for elevated base station antennas for land mobile radio systems such as police, ambulance, and taxi dispatchers. 

 Mast radiator – A radio tower in which the tower structure itself serves as the antenna. Common form of transmitting antenna for AM radio stations and other MF and LF transmitters. At its base the tower is usually, but not necessarily, mounted on a ceramic insulator to isolate it from the ground.

 Folded unipole antenna – is a modified mast antenna, usually grounded at its base, augmented by one or several parallel wires called "skirt wires" that attach to the mast part-way up the antenna. The skirt wires can attach at any height between part-way up and the top of the mast. One or more of the skirt wires is fed with the signal, similar to a gamma match. The number and relative thickness of the mast and the skirt wires adjusts the feedpoint impedance.

 T and inverted L – Consist of a long horizontal wire suspended between two towers with insulators, with a vertical wire hanging down from it, attached to a feedline to the receiver or transmitter. The dangling vertical wire is the radiating part of the antenna. Used on LF and VLF bands. Since at these frequencies the vertical wire is electrically short, much shorter than a quarter wavelength, the horizontal wire(s) serve as a capacitive "hat" to increase the current in the vertical radiator, increasing the gain. Very narrow bandwidth, requires loading coil to tune out any remaining capacitive reactance. Requires low resistance ground.

 Inverted F – Combines the advantages of the compactness of inverted-L antenna, and the good matching of the unipole antenna. The antenna is grounded at the base and fed at some intermediate point. The position of the feed point determines the antenna impedance. Thus, matching can be achieved without the need for a separate matching network.

 Umbrella – Very large wire transmitting antenna with extremely narrow bandwidth, used on VLF bands; relative to the even larger wavelengths it is used for, it is paradoxically an ultra-short antenna. An elaborated version of a T-antenna, it consists of a central radiating tower with multiple wires attached at the top, extending out radially from the mast and insulated at the ends, resembling a metal umbrella frame. Like other ultra-short antennas it has an extremely high capacitive reactance and minimal radiation resistance, which require a large loading coil and low-resistance counterpoise system. Used for long range military submarine communications.

Array

Array antennas consist of multiple simple antennas working together as a single compound antenna. The simple antennas can be dipoles, monopoles, or loops, or mixed loops and dipoles. Broadside arrays consist of multiple identical driven elements, usually dipoles, fed in phase, radiating a beam perpendicular to the antenna plane. Endfire arrays are fed out-of-phase, with the phase difference corresponding to the distance between them; they radiate within the antenna plane. Parasitic arrays consist of multiple antennas, usually dipoles, with one driven element and the rest parasitic elements, which radiate a beam along the line of the antennas.

 Vertical collinear – Consist of several dipoles fed in phase, with their axēs stacked atop each other, in a single vertical line. It is a high-gain omnidirectional antenna, meaning more of the power is radiated in horizontal directions and less wasted radiating up into the sky or down onto the ground. Gain of 8–10 dBi. Used as base station antennas for land mobile radio systems such as police, fire, ambulance, and taxi dispatchers, and sector antennas for cellular base stations.

 Yagi–Uda or "Yagi" – One of the most common directional antennas at HF, VHF, and UHF frequencies. Consists of multiple half-wave dipole elements aligned with their axēs parallel, in the same plane, with a single resonant-length driven element wired to the feedline, usually the next-to-last, next-to-longest element in the array. The multiple other elements are parasitic, which reflect and direct the radiated signal into a single direction, hence a beam antenna.
 Yagi–Udas are used for rooftop television antennas, point-to-point communication links, and long distance shortwave communication using skywave ("skip") reflection from the ionosphere. They typically have gains between 10–20 dBi depending on the number of director elements used, but are very narrow band (with a usable bandwidth of only a few percent).

 Moxon antenna – Is a rectangular-shaped, folded version of a two-element Yagi-Uda.

 Log-periodic dipole array or "fishbone" antenna – Consists of many dipole elements along a boom with gradually increasing lengths, all connected to the transmission line with alternating polarity. It is a directional antenna with a wide bandwidth, which makes it ideal for use as a rooftop television antenna, although its gain is much less than a Yagi of comparable size.

 Reflective array – Multiple dipoles in a two-dimensional array mounted in front of a flat reflecting screen. Used for radar and UHF television transmitting and receiving antennas.

 Phased array – A high gain antenna used at UHF and microwave frequencies which is electronically steerable. It consists of multiple dipoles in a two-dimensional array, each fed through an electronic phase shifter, with the phase shifters controlled by a computer control system. The beam can be instantly pointed in any direction over a wide angle in front of the antenna. Used for military radar and jamming systems.

 Curtain array – Large directional wire transmitting antenna used at HF by shortwave broadcasting stations. It consists of a vertical rectangular array of identical wire dipoles suspended in a parallel row in front of a flat reflector screen, consisting of a second row of vertical parallel "curtain" wires, all supported between two metal towers. It radiates a horizontal beam of radio waves into the sky above the horizon, which is reflected by the ionosphere to Earth beyond the horizon.

 Half-square antenna – A pair of ground-isolated, quarter-wave vertical monopoles, whose tops are connected by a line one half-wavelength long. The verticals are the radiators and function as a two-element array, similar to the bobtail curtain. The structure is shaped like the Greek letter Π (not to be confused with the Half-Loop antenna described below). The top-to-top connecting wire serves as a phased feedline, or an auxiliary feed, which puts the point of maximum current at the top of each monopole. Neither monopole element has a wire connection to the ground beneath it. Top-fed monopoles produce a strong signal low to the horizon, as opposed to an ordinary bottom-fed monopoles. The feedpoint for the combined system may be placed at any of several locations.

 Batwing or superturnstile – A specialized antenna used in television broadcasting consisting of perpendicular pairs of dipoles with radiators resembling bat wings. Multiple batwing antennas are stacked vertically on a mast to make VHF television broadcast antennas. Omnidirectional radiation pattern with high gain in horizontal directions. The batwing shape gives them wide bandwidth.

 Microstrip – an array of patch antennas on a substrate fed by microstrip feedlines. Microwave antenna that can achieve large gains in compact space. Ease of fabrication by PCB techniques have made them popular in modern wireless devices. Beamwidth and polarization can be actively reconfigurable.

Loop

Loop antennas consist of a loop (or coil) of wire. There are essentially two broad categories of loop antennas: large loops (or full-wave loops) and small loops. Only one design, a halo antenna, that is usually called a loop does not exclusively fit into either the large or small loop categories.

Large loops
Full-wave loops have the highest radiation resistance, and hence the highest efficiency of all antennas: Their radiation resistances are several hundreds of Ohms, whereas dipoles and monopoles are tens of Ohms, and small loops are a few ohms, or even fractions of an Ohm.

 Large loops – are loop antennas with perimeter of a full wavelength, two wavelengths, or any whole-number multiple of a wavelength. They are naturally resonant and act somewhat similarly to the full-wave or multi-wave dipole. When it is necessary to distinguish them from small loops, they are called "full-wave" loops.

 Quad – Although "quad" can refer to a single quadrilateral-shaped loop, the term usually refers to two or more loops stacked side by side; at first glance, quads resemble a box kite frame. Only one of the loops in the quad is connected to the feedline, and that loop functions as the driver for the antenna and is the main signal radiator. The other loops are parasitic elements that act as reflectors or directors, focusing the radiated waves in a narrower, single direction and thereby increasing the gain. Quad antennas are the loop analog of Yagi-Uda antennas, and are similarly used as a directional antennas on the HF bands for shortwave communication. They are sometimes preferred for longer wavelengths because (if square) they are half as wide as a Yagi built from dipoles.

 Half-loop – is the upper half of a vertical full-wavelength loop antenna mounted on the ground. The full loop is cut at two opposite points along its perimeter, and the lower half is omitted; the upper half mounted on the ground at the cut points, sticking up from the ground like a satchel handle. It is shaped like the Greek letter Π or an upside-down capital letter U, and is the loop antenna analog of a ground-mounted monopole antenna. Like a vertical monopole, the missing lower half of the antenna is replaced by its ground-plane image. If shaped like a half of a square, a half-loop can operate either as a loop antenna or, on its first harmonic, as a dipole antenna whose ends have been bent over and grounded, depending on the form and location of the feed-point.

In between

 Halo antennas – Loops that are one half-wavelength in perimeter, with a small gap cut in the loop, are called "halo antennas" and are intermediate in size and function between small and large loops. They are often described as a half-wavelength dipole that has been folded into a circle, rather than being a "true loop" antenna.

The approximately-omnidirectional pattern of halos resembles small loops; their radiation efficiency lies inbetween the extremely high efficiency of large loops and the generally poor efficiency of small loops. Like full-wave loops, halos are self-resonant. In some regards they represent the extreme upper size limit of small transmitting loops.

Small loops
Small loop antennas have very low radiation resistance – typically much smaller than the loss resistance of the wire they are made of, making them inefficient for transmitting. However, they are widely used as receiving antennas, especially at low frequencies, where their efficiency is a non-issue and their small size and easily tunable resonance make them a useful solution to the excessive sizes of even quarter-wave antennas.

 Small loops – If the loop perimeter is smaller than a half-wavelength, the loop must be modified in some way to make it resonant, if resonance is necessary. Small loops are called "magnetic loops", and if modified for resonance they are also called "tuned loops". Their directionality and radiation efficiency is drastically different from full-wave loops. Small loops are widely used as compact direction finding antennas.

 Ferrite (loopstick) – Loopsticks consist of a wire coiled around a ferrite core.  The core greatly increases the coil's inductance and its effective signal-capturing area. The radiation pattern is identical to a dipole antenna with a maximum at directions perpendicular to the ferrite rod.  These are used as the receiving antenna in most desktop consumer AM radios operating in the medium wave broadcast band (and lower frequencies). 

The nulls in the radiation pattern  of small loop / ferrite core antennas are bi-directional, and are much sharper than the directions of maximum power of either loop or of electric antennas, and even most beam antennas; the null directionality of small loops is comparable to the maximal directionality of large dish antennas (aperture antennas, see below). This makes the direction of the small loop's null more useful than the direction of the strongest signal for accurately locating a signal source, and the small loop / ferrite core type antenna are useful for radio direction finding (RDF). The null direction of small loops can also be exploited to reject unwanted signals from an interfering station or noise source. Several construction techniques are used to ensure that small receiving loops' null directions are "sharp", including making the perimeter  or  wavelength at most. Small transmitting loops' perimeters are instead made as large as feasibly possible, up to  wave (or even  if possible), in order to improve their generally poor efficiency.

Aperture

An aperture antenna consists of a small dipole or loop feed antenna embedded inside a larger, three-dimensional surrounding structure that guides the radio waves from the feed antenna in a particular direction, and vice versa. The guiding structure is often dish-shaped or funnel-shaped, and quite large compared to a wavelength, with an opening, or aperture, to emit the radio waves in only one direction. Since the outer antenna structure is itself not resonant, it can be used for a wide range of frequencies, by replacing or retuning the inner feed antenna, which normally is resonant.

 Parabolic – The most widely used high gain antenna at microwave frequencies and above. Consists of a dish-shaped metal parabolic reflector with a feed antenna at the focus. It can have some of the highest gains of any antenna type, up to 60 dBi, but the dish must be large compared to a wavelength. Used for radar antennas, point-to-point data links, satellite communication, and radio telescopes.

 Horn – a simple antenna with moderate gain of 15 to 25 dBi that consists of a flaring metal horn attached to a waveguide.  Used for applications such as radar guns, radiometers and as feed antennas for parabolic dishes.
 Slot – consists of a waveguide with one or more slots cut in it to emit the microwaves.  Linear slot antennas emit narrow fan-shaped beams. Used as UHF broadcast antennas and marine radar antennas.

 Lens – a lens antenna consists of layer of dielectric or a metal screen or multiple  waveguide structure of varying thickness in front of a feed antenna, which acts as a lens which refracts the radio waves, focusing them on the feed antenna.

 Dielectric resonator – consists of small ball or puck-shaped piece of dielectric material excited by aperture in waveguide Used at millimeter wave frequencies

Traveling wave

Unlike the antennas discussed so-far, traveling-wave antennas are not resonant so they have inherently broad bandwidth. They are typically wire antennas that are multiple wavelengths long, through which the voltage and current waves travel in one direction, instead of bouncing back and forth to form standing waves as in resonant antennas. They have linear polarization (except for the helical antenna). Unidirectional traveling-wave antennas are terminated by a resistor at one end equal to the antenna's characteristic resistance, to absorb the waves from one direction. This makes them inefficient as transmitting antennas, but when used for receiving removes half of the incident radio noise while preserving the desired signal.

 Beverage – Simplest unidirectional traveling-wave antenna. Consists of a straight wire one to several wavelengths long, suspended near the ground, connected to the receiver at one end and terminated by a resistor equal to its characteristic impedance, 400–800 Ω at the other end. Its radiation pattern has a main lobe at a shallow angle in the sky off the terminated end. It is used for reception of skywaves reflected off the ionosphere in long distance "skip" shortwave communication.

 Rhombic – Consists of four equal wire sections shaped like a rhombus. It is fed by a balanced feedline at one of the acute corners, and the two sides are connected to a resistor equal to the characteristic resistance of the antenna at the other. It has a main lobe in a horizontal direction off the terminated end of the rhombus. Used for skywave communication on shortwave bands.

 Leaky wave – Microwave antennas consisting of a waveguide or coaxial cable with a slot or apertures cut in it so it radiates continuously along its length.

 Helical (axial mode) – Consists of a wire in the shape of a helix mounted above a reflecting screen, whose coiled length is on the order of one wavelength. It radiates circularly polarized waves in a beam off the end, with a typical gain of 15 dBi. It is used at VHF and UHF frequencies where antenna sizes are feasible. Often used for satellite communication, which uses circular polarization because it is insensitive to the relative rotation on the beam axis. When a helical antenna has about 10 turns or more, each turn a full wavelength, then it is a form of traveling-wave antenna. If it only has a few turns (or just one) and the turns' totaled circumference is one or a few wavelengths, then it is some variety of a large loop antenna.

Isotropic

An isotropic antenna (isotropic radiator) is a hypothetical antenna that radiates equal signal power in all directions. 

An antenna that is exactly isotropic is only a mathematical model, used as the base of comparison to calculate the directionality or gain of real antennas. No actual antenna can produce a perfectly isotropic radiation pattern, but the isotropic radiation pattern serves as a "worst case" reference for comparing the degree to which other antennas, regardless of type, can project radiation in one direction.

Nearly isotropic antennas can be made by combining several small antennas; these are used for field strength measurement, as standard reference antennas for testing other antennas, and as emergency antennas on satellites, since they work even when the satellite has lost orientation towards its communication station.

An isotropic antenna should not be confused with an omnidirectional antenna; an isotropic antenna radiates equal power in all three dimensions, while an omnidirectional antenna radiates equal power in all horizontal directions, with the power radiated varying with elevation angle, but decreasing in the direction parallel to the antenna's vertical axis; for several antenna types there is no radiation at all in the exact vertical direction.

Other antenna types

 Random wire antenna – A random wire is the typical informal antenna erected for receiving shortwave and AM radio. It consists of a random length of wire either strung outdoors between elevated supports, or indoors across a ceiling, running in an erratic zigzag pattern along walls or between supports. One end of the wire is connected to the receiver. Its description by Moxon (1993) is "the odd bit of wire".

The shape and length of a "random" wire is determined by available space and supports, instead of being laid out in a single straight line in a planned direction, and is generally not trimmed to any resonant length. A random wire antenna typically has a complicated radiation pattern, with several lobes at varying angles to each wire segment, in different directions for each, which depend on frequency and segment length.

Random wire antennas are often included as a sub-category of folded monopole antennas, if their lengths are a quarter-wave or less, or folded end-fed dipoles if a half-wave or more, up to one or two wavelengths or less. When they are laid out with at least one extended segment oriented in a straight line, one to several wavelengths long, they operate essentially the same as a traveling-wave antenna. Random wire antennas laid out along the ground are called "snake antennas" and are sometimes included among Beverage antennas as an extreme case of that type.

Notes

References

Antennas
Radio frequency antenna types